The Legend of Zelda is a series of video games by Nintendo.

The Legend of Zelda may also refer to:

 The Legend of Zelda (video game), a 1986 game for the Nintendo Entertainment System and the first entry in the series
 The Legend of Zelda (manga), comics based on the franchise
 The Legend of Zelda (TV series), a 1989 animated series